Bryncarnau Grasslands, Llwydcoed is a Site of Special Scientific Interest in Llwydcoed near Aberdare, south Wales.

See also
List of Sites of Special Scientific Interest in Mid & South Glamorgan

Sites of Special Scientific Interest in Rhondda Cynon Taf